Aberdeen Student Show is a comedy musical and theatrical show, staged annually in Aberdeen, Scotland.  

In recent year’s Aberdeen Student Show has received wide acclaim for its parody shows of well known films and musicals. All monies raised by the show go to charities across the North-East of Scotland. The groups 2019’s production of ‘The Glakit Showman’ (a parody of 2017’s The Greatest Showman) went onto raise over £122,000 for local charities.

The Student Show has been held every year since 1921 (with the exception of 2020 due to the COVID-19 pandemic).  From the start it has involved a number of young writers, performers and musicians who have gone on to greater renown in the fields of theatre, media and the arts.

The show is staged in Aberdeen largest professional theatre, His Majesty’s Theatre and has generated a reputation for selling out the venue.  It usually reflects the culture and humour of people living in North-east Scotland.

The Student Show is coordinated by its Administrator’s Team and performed by students of The University of Aberdeen, Robert Gordon University and North East Scotland College.  It is generally written and produced by former students and show alumni.

Aberdeen Student Show will return in April 2023 with their production of ‘Ayetanic’, a Doric parody of the Academy Award Winning and much-loved 1997 film, Titanic. Tickets for the production are sold through the Aberdeen Box Office (www.aberdeenperformingarts.com).

Productions

A more comprehensive database is available in Google Docs.

History 
In 1920, at the prompting of the authorities at Aberdeen Royal Infirmary, the students' representative council (SRC) of Aberdeen University established a series of fund-raising events in aid of local hospitals; central to which was the annual Gala Week.  In 1921 the Gala Week opened with the first Student Show, a mock trial (of a breach of promise case) held in the Aberdeen University Debating Chamber ("The Debater") at Marischal College.
The Gala Week Committee then invited the University Debating Society to stage an annual musical comedy or revue based on student life.  The first of these, in 1922, ‘Stella, the Bajanella’
was written by then undergraduate Eric Linklater with music by JS Taylor. The Show then became an annual event, performed in various venues in Aberdeen, including the Training Centre Hall in St. Andrew Street, the Aberdeen College Hall and the Palace Theatre in 1927 and 1928, before finding a home in His Majesty's Theatre in 1929.  Since then it has occasionally been performed elsewhere in the city, when His Majesty's Theatre was unavailable – the Aberdeen College of Education in 1981 and 1982, the Music Hall Aberdeen in 2004 and His Majesty's Theatre – Hilton (the former College of Education theatre) in 2005.

The Student Show was produced every year in Aberdeen without a break from 1921, including throughout World War II, until 2020, when for the first time ever the show was cancelled, due to the COVID-19 pandemic.

The cast is made up of volunteer students.  They rehearse each new show during the Easter academic vacation.  The following week - the first of the academic summer term - they perform the show, generally in the evenings, in front of paying audiences.

The 2019 Student Show, 'The Glaikit Showman' was staged at His Majesty's Theatre, raised a record breaking £122,000 for Aberdeen University Raising and Giving, with all proceeds going towards helping 36 different local charities.  This compares with £32,000 ('Date Expectations', 2008); £38,000 ('Dial 'M' for Mastrick, 2009,); £49,000 ('Back to the Teuchter', 2010); £56,000 ('Sleepless in Seaton', 2011), £57,969 ('Mary Torphins', 2012) and £67,386.60 (Spital Shop of Horrors', 2013). 

The 2022/23 academic year brought record success to Aberdeen Student Show. Due to the delayed performance of ‘Freezin’ due to the Covid-19 pandemic the theatrical society performed twice in a single academic year, the first time since 1936. During this academic year, their productions of ‘Freezin’ and ‘Dirty Danestone’ raised over £217,000 for local charities.

Cultural background
The Student Show traditionally draws on the humour and character of the North-east of Scotland.  Much use is usually made of the Aberdonian dialect, as well as the Doric dialect spoken in rural parts of the North-east.

Notable alumni
Among those who were associated with the Student Show in its earlier years were Eric Linklater, Sonia Dresdel, Stephen Mitchell, Moultrie Kelsall,  and Andrew Cruickshank. Cruickshank later became famous for his portrayal of Dr Cameron in the 1960s BBC Television series Dr Finlay's Casebook.  Participants from later in the 20th Century include playwright and educationalist James Scotland, William "Buff" Hardie and Stephen Robertson of Scotland the What?, and members of The Flying Pigs. Other locally or nationally renowned past-performers, many of whom went on to careers in the news and entertainment industries, include Margo Barron, Derek Brechin,  Quentin Cramb, Larry Gray,  David and Gwen Haggart, Margaret Hardie, Jill Hay, Harry Hill, "Torry Quine" and Grampian TV celebrity June Imray, Douglas Kynoch (a broadcaster for over 30 years with Grampian Television and BBC Scotland, presenting the TV news programmes "Reporting Scotland" and "Nationwide", and the radio show "Good Morning Scotland"), Graham Stuart (BAFTA-award winning producer of So Graham Norton in 2001), Donald Manson, Ian Middler, George and Sheila Reid, Eva Robertson, Ruth Nicol Smith, Barry Symes and Laura Main.

Notable directors
Novelist, historian and playwright, Eric Linklater (director 1922–24) wrote and directed the first Student Show proper; 'Stella, the Bajanella'.  His play 'To Meet the Macgregors' was performed as the Student Show in 1946. This was during his tenure as Rector of Aberdeen University from 1945 to 1948.

Dr Douglas S. Raitt (known as "Rab The Rhymer") (director 1931, 1933–34, 1938–39) was a marine biologist who worked in the Marine Laboratory in the Aberdeen district of Torry. He was also a popular radio performer, singing at the piano in broadcasts from the British Broadcasting Corporation (BBC) Aberdeen Studios. He died age 41 as a result of an accident with a car on 4 October 1944. The shows from 1935 to 1939 were musical comedies, mostly written by students under Raitt's direction. The 1933 show 'Town and Gown' was rewritten extensively and presented in its new form for a week in September 1934.  This unusual timing for Student Show, during the university long vacation, was so as to coincide on 10 and 11 September 1934 with the third visit to Aberdeen of the British Association for the Advancement of Science.

Moultrie Kelsall, while head of the  British Broadcasting Corporation's Aberdeen Radio Station, 2BD, produced 'Aurora Borealis' in 1932. Kelsall subsequently had a 30-year acting career in television and movies.

Reginald Barrett-Ayres (1920–1981), a graduate of Edinburgh University, was Director of Music at the Quaker Ackworth School near Pontefract, Yorkshire from 1942 to 45; and at Glasgow Academy from 1945 to 51. He joined Aberdeen University's Department of Music and Drama, as a Lecturer in January 1951. He became acting Head of Department in 1956 and remained in post (latterly, as Reader and Head of Department) until his death in a road accident at age 61. He was an expert on the music of Haydn, particularly the string quartets. His own compositions included three operas, concertos for violin and double bass, operettas, choral works, solos, duets, anthems and hymns. He was involved in many of the University's theatrical and musical productions, directing or co-directing an unsurpassed nine Student Shows between 1955 and 1965. With George Low he co-wrote the Show theme song "Spirit of Show". 'Laughing at Life', a show consisting of original music and arrangements, is listed as "c. 1961", but is likely to be the 1954 Student Show of the same title.

"A. Hay Prestowe" (co-director 1944) was the pseudonym of Andrew Shivas.  While he was an undergraduate at Aberdeen he played in the university dance orchestra, was a tympanist for the university symphony orchestra, a pipe band big drummer, and student show xylophonist. He was also an accomplished conjurer, from which arose his pseudonym (a play on hey presto!), and co-founder, in 1925, of the Aberdeen Magical Society. A pathologist in later life in Edinburgh, Dr Shivas died of a stroke in 1996.

Roddy Begg, director of the 1974, 1979 and 1983 Student Shows, and of the 2000 and 2005 reunions, has a lifelong interest in the theatre, acting and directing for Aberdeen's Studio Theatre Group (which he co-founded in the 1960s) and other dramatic and musical groups. He was Director of the Edinburgh Festival Fringe Society and Honorary Vice President of Aberdeen Opera Company. A graduate of the University of Aberdeen, he was a member of staff for over three decades, as Secretary to the Faculties of Medicine and Science, Registry Officer, Clerk to the Senate, and Secretary to the University. He retired as Secretary in 1999, taking up the post of Director of Alumni Relations. He retired from the University in February 2002. In November 2006 he was awarded the Degree of Doctor of Honoris Causa by Aberdeen University, in recognition of his lifelong commitment to the Institution.

Charles Barron (1936-2012) was Student Show director 1977–78 and reunion co-director 2005. He had a long and prolific tenure in the dramatic arts, Doric dialect and history of the Scottish North-East.  He graduated from Aberdeen University with a First Class Honours Degree in English Language and Literature, taught in Aberdeen and Inverurie, where began a 40-year association with Haddo House, as Shakespearean actor, Director of Operas, Arts Director and creator of the Youth Theatre.   In 1970, he became Head of Speech and Drama at Aberdeen College of Education (later the Northern College of Education, which eventually became subsumed within Aberdeen University). He was the award-winning author of the Doric plays ‘Fooshion’ and ‘Amang the Craws’.

Rhona Mitchell choreographed the 1978, 1979 and 1981 shows, and also directed in 1981. She has worked professionally on radio and stage and as a freelance voice coach, drama tutor and director for more than 25 years with Scottish Television, BBC Scotland and many theatres across Scotland.  She founded the Mitchell School of Drama in Inverurie in 1983.  She co-directed the Abderite Theatre Company, in which capacity she directed 'Gobi's Eyes' in 2004, and 'Ouch' in 2005. She also produced the first Garioch Theatre Festival in April 2005.

Ronnie Middleton, an Arts Graduate of Aberdeen University, mathematics teacher at Powis Academy and later Cults Academy, dancer, singer and multi-faceted actor, directed Student Show in 1986 and from 1988 to 90, co-directed the 2000 reunion and took part as cast member in many shows in the 1970s. Ronnie was a prolific performer and director with local theatre groups. He co-founded the Aberdeen Phoenix Theatre Company. He was also closely involved in the Attic Theatre Company, in Powis Academy stage productions, Temporary Fault and Punchline, until his death from cancer in 2002. Ronnie is also remembered for his secret, but well-known, fortnightly role at Pittodrie Stadium as Angus the Bull, Aberdeen Football Club's mascot.

Other notable contributors
George Sinclair, formerly headmaster at Powis Academy, stage-managed 38 Student Shows from the 1950s, many of them with the assistance of Colin MacKenzie, who eventually succeeded him as stage manager of Show.  During the same period George Sinclair also stage-managed 32 shows for the Aberdeen Lyric Musical Society.

Other notable contributors behind the scenes, as recollected by former Show set designer Edi Swan, include stage managers Bill McCann, Derek Nisbet, Sandy Youngson, John Webster and Gus Law; choreographers Eileen Ewen (1947–57) and Jean Birse; set designers Alex Young and Melvin Dalgarno; make-up artists George Grant and Sandy Dale; wardrobe mistresses Alice Sparke and Ena McLaughlan; and administrators Philip Ross, Robin McLeod, Bob Downie, John Bain, Alec Main and John Duffus.

The script editor for the 1951 Student Show 'Spring In Your Step' was Colin MacLean, who went on to be the Founding Editor, in 1965, of the Times Educational Supplement, Scotland, and from March 1979 to June 1990 was Managing Director (Publishing) of Aberdeen University Press.

Theme song
The 1922 theme song "Stella, the Bajanella", by R. F. G. McCallum and J. S. Taylor, became a popular anthem for many years. It was replaced in the 1950s by "Spirit of Show", written by George Low with music by Reginald Barrett-Ayres. "Spirit of Show" has since remained the traditional anthem of Student Show.

Descendant comedy shows
"Scotland the What?". William "Buff" Hardie and Steve Robertson first met in the Student Show in 1952. George Donald, another University of Aberdeen student, wrote music for the 1954 Student Show, but did not take part in it.  So all three only met together later through the Aberdeen Revue Group, which is where they also found their future producer Jimmy Logan. (He later had to revert in public to his formal first name "James" in order to join the actors' union Equity, because there was already a Glaswegian comic using the professional name Jimmy Logan.)  Buff Hardie had first appeared in the 1951 Student Show 'Spring in Your Step', and co-wrote the 1957 show 'College Bounds'. But it was after the 1968 Show 'Running Riot' - which the four men wrote, composed, produced and directed - that the idea of putting on a show of their own at the Edinburgh Festival was first mooted.  The on-stage trio of Hardie, Robertson and Donald first appeared under the banner of "Scotland the What?" at the Edinburgh Festival Fringe in 1969.  Jimmy Logan, who directed the Student Show in 1966, 1968, 1972 and 1973, also directed "Scotland the What?" from 1969 until his death in 1993.

"Temporary Fualt" (sic) and "Punchline". Michael Jamieson and Gary Simpson first took part in the 1976 Show 'A Just in Time'. Gary served as Student Show script editor (1981–82). In 1978 and 1980 they wrote and produced two "Temporary Fualt" revues at the Aberdeen University Student Union, and, in 1982 and 1983, the revues "Punchline: Second Hand News" and "Punchline: Upstage Downstage" at the Aberdeen Arts Centre. Many Student Show cast members took part, and several of the sketches first performed in these revues were reprised in subsequent Student Shows. After contributing to the script of the 2011 Student Show, Michael Jamieson wrote and produced Dr. Fa and the Thing fae Outer Speyside, which was performed and recorded at Dunbar Street Hall, Old Aberdeen on 3 January 2012. A number of current and former Student Show participants took part.

"The Flying Pigs". Student Show members Andrew Brebner, Scott Christie, Shirley Cummings, Greg Gordon, Oli Knox, John Hardie, Fiona Lussier and Craig Pike formed The Flying Pigs in 1997. Now with a line-up containing Moray Barber, Andrew Brebner, Elaine Clark, Greg Gordon, Susan Gordon, John Hardie, Craig Pike and Steve Rance, the group have performed twelve revues in Aberdeen, at the Aberdeen Arts Centre, Lemon Tree Studio Theatre, and His Majesty's Theatre; as well as recording a BBC Scotland Radio series (Desperate Fishwives). A BBC Scotland TV Pilot of the same name was broadcast on 14 December 2010. A production marking 20 years since their debut was staged at His Majesty's Theatre in June 2018.

Titles
'Stella, the Bajanella' (1922) was apparently named for Stella Henriques, a medical student at Aberdeen University. Bajan, a medieval term (literally 'yellow beak' – bec jaune), describing trainees in the pre-student year, was traditionally applied to Aberdeen University freshmen. Female students were referred to as "bajanellas".

1928's 'Admirable Crichton' was a production of The Admirable Crichton, a comedy play written in 1902 by Scotsman J. M. Barrie, Rector of the University of St Andrews from 1919 to 1922. Barrie's older brother, Alexander, graduated with honours in Classics at Aberdeen University in 1866.

Several titles employ or make puns from local place names – 'Rosemount Nights' (1923); 'Mounthooly The Magic Roundabout' (1990), based on the city's iconic Mounthooly Roundabout;  'Woodside Storey' (1993),  'The Sound of Mastrick' (1995), 'From Rubislaw With Love' (1998) 'Butch Cassie-End and The SunnyBank Kid' (2000) [the Aberdeen district of Causewayend is pronounced "Cassie-end"], 'A Midstocket's Night Scream' (2002), 'An American in Powis' (2003), 'Dial 'M' For Mastrick' (2009), 'Mary Torphins' (2012), 'Spital Shop of Horrors' (2013), 'Tilly Elliot' (2015) [Tilly being shortened from Tillydrone] and 'Sister Echt' (2017).
Three shows use the local pronunciation of Footdee – 'Fittie':  'A Tale of Two Fitties' (2000),  'Fittie Woman' (2005) and ‘Fittie Fittie Bang Bang’ (2018).

Some titles draw on the local Doric dialect: 'Kings and Quines' (1969) [quine = girl]; 'Fit's At!' (1973) [ = what's that?]; 'Fit Next!' (1974) [= what next ?/ now what?];  'Fit Like' (1975) [how are you?];  'Fit's On?' (1982)[= what's on?];  'Scaffie Society' (1997) [scaffie = street orderly. Cafe Society was a local restaurant and bar]; 'The Codfaither' (2001) (faither = father); cod refers to the formerly pre-eminent fishing port of Aberdeen;  and 'Back To The Teuchter' (2010) – Teuchter being a Doric-speaking North-east Scot.

Many titles, traditionally, are puns and plays on other well-known theatrical titles, e.g.  'Folies Berserques' (1960) – Folies Bergère;  'Risques Galore' (1980) – Whisky Galore;  'A Coarse Line' (1986) – A Chorus Line; 'The Provost Of Oz' (1987) – The Wizard of Oz;  'Mounthooly The Magic Roundabout'  (1990) – The Magic Roundabout;  'N.E. Man and The Burgers Of Doom'  (1991) – Indiana Jones and the Temple of Doom;  Woodside Storey (1993) – West Side Story;  Alas Poor Doric (1994) – "alas poor Yorick!" from Hamlet;  The Sound of Mastrick (1995) – The Sound of Music;  'The Good, The Bad and The Buttery' (1996) – The Good, the Bad and the Ugly. (Buttery is an Aberdeen breakfast roll); 'From Rubislaw With Love' (1998) – From Russia With Love; 'A Tale of Two Fitties' (1999) – A Tale of Two Cities;  'Butch Cassie-End and The SunnyBank Kid' (2000) – Butch Cassidy and the Sundance Kid;  'The Codfaither'  (2001) – The Godfather;  'A Midstocket's Night Scream' (2002) – A Midsummer Night's Dream;  'An American in Powis' (2003) – An American in Paris;  'Spook Who's Talking' (2004) – Look Who's Talking; 'Fittie Woman' (2005) - Pretty Woman;  'Yokel Hero' (2006) – Local Hero;  'Invasion of the Doric Snatchers' (2007) – Invasion of the Body Snatchers;  'Date Expectations' (2008) – Great Expectations; also based on the Cilla Black TV show 'Blind Date';  'Dial 'M' For Mastrick' (2009) – Dial M For Murder; 'Back To The Teuchter' (2010) – Back to the Future; 'Sleepless in Seaton' (2011) - Sleepless in Seattle; 'Mary Torphins' (2012) - Mary Poppins; 'Spital Shop of Horrors' (2013) - Little Shop of Horrors; ' Wullie Wonkie and the Fine Piece Factory' (2014) - Willy Wonka & the Chocolate Factory; 'Tilly Elliot' (2015) - Billy Elliot; 'Michty Mia!' (2016) - Mamma Mia!; 'Sister Echt' (2017) - Sister Act; ‘Fittie Fittie Bang Bang’ (2018) - Chitty Chitty Bang Bang; ‘The Galikit Showman’ (2019) - The Greatest Showman; ‘Freezin’ (2021) - Frozen; ‘Dirty Danestone’ (2022) - Dirty Dancing; ‘Ayetanic’ (2023) - Titanic.

The 1976 title, originally 'Just in Time', was changed by Director Paul Cowan to 'A Just in Time', as a play on 'adjusting' time (the show having a running time-travel theme).

Reunions

Under the auspices of the Aberdeen University Alumnus Association, reunion cabarets (titled "Spirit Of The Show", honouring the Barrett-Ayres and Low composition) featuring former members from Student Shows as early as 1942 were held at the Aberdeen University Student Union in 1995 (coinciding with the University's Quincentennial); and at the University's Elphinstone Hall in 2000 and 2005. Approximately 250 former cast members attended each reunion, of whom about 70 re-enacted sketches and musical numbers from former shows. The oldest performer in the 2000 reunion was Duncan Murray, a retired doctor from Kent, who had appeared in the Show between 1942 and 1945.  He sang "Rosemount Rosie", one of the most popular Student Show numbers of the 1940s.

The theatrical society were hosted by Lord Provost David Cameron and Aberdeen City Council with a Civic Reception in the cities Beach Ballroom. This took place in May 2022 and celebrated 100 years of the charitable student association. Notable show alumni including Amy lamb, Alex Brown and John Hardie of The Flying Pigs spoke at the event. This was a particularly notable year for the show, due to the delayed performance of ‘Freezin’ due to the Covid-19 pandemic, Aberdeen Student Show performed twice in a single academic year. The show had not performed twice in an academic year since 1936. During this period the group raised over £210,000.

References

Culture in Aberdeen
Tourist attractions in Aberdeen
Student theatre in Scotland
Annual events in Scotland
1921 establishments in Scotland
Recurring events established in 1921